The Moscow Country Club is a golf club in Russia.

Golf
The idea of building a championship golf course in Russia, dates back to the early 1970s when leaders of the Russian Government invited American executive Armand Hammer to Russia to find out what Russia needed to entice Western business. Hammer answered "limousines and a golf course".

In 1988 construction began on what, six years later, was Russia's first 18-hole golf course. The club has an 18-hole, 7,015 yard championship golf course designed by Robert Trent Jones, Jr. The European PGA endorsed the club. Since its opening in 1993, the Moscow Country Club has become the permanent venue for a number of major golf competitions, including the Russian Open, the country's first professional golf tournament. Moscow Country Club has been the venue for European Tour event, the Russian Open since its inauguration, and also hosts the annual President of Russia Golf Cup.

References

External links
Moscow Country Club
GlavUpDK
Вконтакте Moscow Countru Club

Sports venues in Moscow
Golf clubs and courses in Russia
Entertainment companies established in 1994
Krasnogorsky District, Moscow Oblast
1994 establishments in Russia